Lê Duy Kỳ was the birth name of:
 Emperor Lê Thần Tông
 Emperor Lê Chiêu Thống